The Barrier is a Spanish dystopian drama TV series created by Daniel Écija and starring Unax Ugalde, Olivia Molina and Eleonora Wexler. It first aired on Atresplayer Premium in January 2020. It debuted internationally in September 2020 on Netflix.

Synopsis 
In the 2040s, twenty years after World War III, Spain faces radiation, disease, and extreme shortages.  A despotic government rises and places the country under martial law.  Madrid is divided into two sectors separated by a wall.  The wealthy and powerful live in relative safety and luxury, but everyone else lives in squalor and in fear of forced disappearances.

Cast 
 Unax Ugalde as Hugo Mujica
 Olivia Molina as Julia Pérez Noval
 Eleonora Wexler as Alma López-Durán
  as Luis Covarrubias
 Ángela Molina as Emilia Noval
  as Coronel Enrique
 Daniel Ibáñez as Álex Mujica
 Laura Quirós as Marta Mujica
 Elena Seijo as Rosa
 Óscar de la Fuente as Fernando
 Ángela Vega as Begoña Sánchez
 Nicolás Illoro as Iván Covarrubias
 Belén Écija as Daniela Covarrubias
 Yaima Ramos as Manuela
  Alina Nastase as Chica espía.

Release
The Barrier premiered on Atresplayer Premium on 19 January 2020. The finale aired on 12 April 2020. The free-to-air broadcasting run on Antena 3 started on 10 September 2020. The series was released on Netflix on 11 September 2020.

Awards and nominations

References

External links
 
 

Spanish-language television shows
Atresplayer Premium original programming
2020 Spanish television series debuts
2020s Spanish drama television series
Television series set in the 2040s
Television shows set in Madrid
Dystopian television series
Television series by Good Mood